The 1994 Arizona State Sun Devils baseball team represented Arizona State University in the 1994 NCAA Division I baseball season. The Sun Devils played their home games at Packard Stadium, and played as part of the Pacific-10 Conference. The team was coached by Jim Brock in his twenty-fourth and final season as head coach at Arizona State.

The Sun Devils reached the College World Series, their sixteenth appearance in Omaha, where they finished tied for fourth place after recording two wins against Miami (FL) and losing a pair of games to eventual champion Oklahoma.  Brock died three days after Arizona State was eliminated from the College World Series.

Personnel

Roster

Coaches

Schedule and results

References

Arizona State Sun Devils baseball seasons
Arizona State Sun Devils
College World Series seasons
Arizona State Sun Devils baseball
Arizona State